This article lists important figures and events in Malaysian public affairs during the year 1966, together with births and deaths of significant Malaysians.

Incumbent political figures

Federal level
Yang di-Pertuan Agong: Sultan Ismail Nasiruddin Shah of Terengganu
Raja Permaisuri Agong: Tengku Intan Zaharah of Terengganu
Prime Minister: Tunku Abdul Rahman Putra Al-Haj
Deputy Prime Minister: Datuk Abdul Razak
Lord President: James Beveridge Thomson then Syed Sheh Hassan Barakbah

State level
 Sultan of Johor: Sultan Ismail
 Sultan of Kedah: Sultan Abdul Halim Muadzam Shah (Deputy Yang di-Pertuan Agong)
 Sultan of Kelantan: Sultan Yahya Petra
 Raja of Perlis: Tuanku Syed Putra
 Sultan of Perak: Sultan Idris Shah
 Sultan of Pahang: Sultan Abu Bakar
 Sultan of Selangor: Sultan Salahuddin Abdul Aziz Shah
 Sultan of Terengganu: Tengku Mahmud (Regent)
 Yang di-Pertuan Besar of Negeri Sembilan: Tuanku Munawir
 Yang di-Pertua Negeri (Governor) of Penang: Raja Tun Uda
 Yang di-Pertua Negeri (Governor) of Malacca: Tun Haji Abdul Malek bin Yusuf
 Yang di-Pertua Negeri (Governor) of Sarawak: Tun Abang Haji Openg
 Yang di-Pertua Negeri (Governor) of Sabah: Tun Pengiran Ahmad Raffae

Events
8 February – The National Monument or Tugu Negara in Kuala Lumpur was officially opened.
11 April – Sultan Ismail Nasiruddin Shah of Terengganu was installed as the fourth Yang di-Pertuan Agong.
28 May – The Malaysian and Indonesian governments declared that the confrontation was over. The peace treaty was signed in Bangkok, Thailand.
8 July – The Anugerah Sukan Negara or National Sports Awards were introduced. Mani Jegathesan and Mary Rajamani won the first awards.
September – The governor of Sarawak declared a state of emergency in Sarawak during the 1966 Sarawak constitutional crisis.
21 October – The 150th anniversary of Penang Free School was celebrated.
30-31 October – US President Lyndon Baines Johnson visited Malaysia for the first time. On 31 October, President Johnson visited Kampung Labu Jaya village (now FELDA LB Johnson) in Negeri Sembilan state.
1 December – First Malaysia Plan was implemented.

Births
 2 April – Din Beramboi (real name Mior Ahmad Fuad Mior Badri) – actor, comedian and Era FM DJ
 30 April – Ahmad Maslan – Malaysian politician
 19 November – Nazir Razak – renowned banker, former CIMB Bank Chairman (2014-2020)

Deaths
2 June – Richard O. Winstedt – English orientalist

See also
 1965 in Malaysia | 1967 in Malaysia
 History of Malaysia

 
Years of the 20th century in Malaysia
Malaysia
Malaysia
1960s in Malaysia